Jaynagar Assembly constituency is a Legislative Assembly constituency of the South 24 Parganas district in the Indian State of West Bengal. It is reserved for Scheduled Castes.

Overview
As per order of the Delimitation Commission in respect of the Delimitation of constituencies in the West Bengal, Jaynagar Assembly constituency is composed of the following:
 Jaynagar Majilpur Municipality
 Baharu Kshetra, Dakshin Barasat, Harinarayanpur, Rajpur Korabag, Sripur and Uttar Durgapur gram panchayats of the Jaynagar I community development block
 Beladurganagar, Phutigoda, Gordoani, Mayahauri, Mayda and Sahajadapur gram panchayats of the Jaynagar II community development block

Jaynagar Assembly constituency is a part of the No. 19 Jaynagar (Lok Sabha constituency).

Members of Legislative Assembly

Election Results

Legislative Assembly Election 2021

Legislative Assembly Election 2016

Legislative Assembly Election 2011

Legislative Assembly Elections 1977–2006
Debaparasad Sarkar of SUCI(C) has represented the Jaynagar Assembly constituency from 1977 to 2006. He defeated his nearest rivals, Ashish Ghosh of CPI(M) in 2006, Abdul Hossain Laskar of CPI(M) in 2001, Rabindranath Basu of CPI(M) in 1996, Prashanta Sarkhel of INC in 1991, Kumud Bhattacharya of ICS in 1987 and 1982, and Jnantosh Chakraborty of Janata Party in 1977.

Legislative Assembly Elections 1952–1972
Prasun Ghosh of INC won in 1972. Subodh Banarjee of SUCI(C) won in 1971, 1969 and 1967. In 1962, Jaynagar Assembly constituency had two seats. Jnantosh Chakraborty of INC won the Jaynagar Uttar seat and Anadi Mohan Tanti of INC won the Jaynagar Dakshin seat. In 1957 and 1952, Jaynagar Assembly constituency had joint seats. In 1957, Subodh Banerjee and Renupada Halder, both of SUCI(C), won. In 1952, Subodh Banerjee and Dinataran Moni, both of SUCI(C), won.

References

Notes

Citations

Assembly constituencies of West Bengal
Politics of South 24 Parganas district
Politics of Jaynagar Majilpur